Cristofer Clemente (born 15 October 1985) is a Spanish male trail runner and sky runner, who won 2016 Skyrunner World Series in the Sky Ultra and silver medal at the 2017 IAU Trail World Championships held in Badia Prataglia.

References

External links
 Cristofer Clemente profile at ITRA
 Official web site

1985 births
Living people
Spanish sky runners
Trail runners